Walter Walsh, D.D., (13 April 1857 – 20 May 1931) was a Scottish religious leader and peace activist.

Early life and education
Walsh was born in Dundee on 13 April 1857. He was educated at the High School of Dundee and the University of Glasgow. In 1910, he received his D.D. from Pittsburgh University.

Career
Walsh served as a Congregational minister in 
Pitlochry (1882–86), Newcastle (1887–97), and Dundee (1897–1912). He was a member of the Newcastle-on-Tyne School Board (1891–97) and also served on the Dundee City Council (1906–12). In 1912, he was condemned for holding Universalist views by the Edinburgh Court of Session, and was deprived of church properties.

In 1913, he moved to London and replaced the late Charles Voysey as minister of the Theistic Church, which sought a middle path between Liberal Christianity and Unitarianism. In 1916, he became leader of the Free Religious Movement. He also took an interest in social issues such as pacifism, education, and housing. He was a municipal delegate to various housing conferences in Europe. He was also a vice-president of the Universal Peace Union and attended numerous international peace conferences in Europe and America, where he made several tours lecturing and preaching in connection with the international peace movement.

Personal life and death
In 1882, Walsh married Alice Mary Lambert (1855–1937). They had four sons and five daughters. He died in Whetstone, London on 20 May 1931, aged 74.

The Rev. Dr. Walsh is sometimes confused with his English contemporary Walter Walsh (1847–1912), a lay Protestant who also wrote works on religion; the two men do not appear to have been related.

Selected bibliography
The Moral Damage of War (1902)
Jesus in Juteopolis (1906)
The Greater Parables of Tolstoy (1906)
Hymns of Divine Unity and Love (1915)
The World Rebuilt (1917)
The Golden Rule (1920)

Notes

References

External links 
 Works by Walter Walsh (1857–1931) at Internet Archive
 

1931 deaths
People from Dundee
Alumni of the University of Glasgow
People educated at the High School of Dundee
1857 births
20th-century Scottish writers
Scottish pacifists